The 1948 Texas Longhorns football team represented the University of Texas in the 1948 college football season. After the season, Tom Landry signed with the New York Yanks of the All-America Football Conference.

Schedule

References

Texas
Texas Longhorns football seasons
Orange Bowl champion seasons
Texas Longhorns football